Banksia Creek is a watercourse in Western Australia. It is located at 33° 54' 9" S 115° 17' 43" E, about 25 kilometres (16 mi) south of Busselton in the Shire of Augusta-Margaret River. A tributary of Margaret River North, it runs in a westerly direction for about two kilometres (1.2 mi) before joining Margaret River North just south of Canebreak Pool. The name refers to the plant genus Banksia, which grows in the area.

References
 Banksia Creek in the Gazetteer of Australia

Watercourses of Western Australia